Kristian Seeber (born November 10, 1980), known professionally as Tina Burner, is an American drag performer most known for appearing in Shade: Queens of NYC and on the thirteenth season of RuPaul's Drag Race. She was a part of a boy band named 5th Ring.

Early life
Seeber was born and raised in Lowville, NY.

Career
Seeber used to be in a boy band. Tina Burner has been named National Miss Comedy Queen and competed on thirteenth season of RuPaul's Drag Race, where she was eliminated in episode 11 and finished in seventh place. She also worked with fashion designer Nicolas Putvinski for a time.

In 2022, Burner toured the world with their show, Witch Perfect with fellow RPDR stars Scarlet Envy and Alexis Michelle. Written by Burner and writing partner Blake Allen, the show is a parody of the Disney movie Hocus Pocus.

Personal life
Seeber was previously in a relationship with Graham Norton, a judge on RuPaul's Drag Race UK; the two had met at Barracuda Lounge in New York City. Seeber moved to the United Kingdom to be with Norton, until their separation in 2006.

Discography

Filmography

Television

Web series

See also
 LGBT culture in New York City
 List of LGBT people from New York City

References

External links

 Kristian Serber at IMDb

Living people
American drag queens
Gay entertainers
LGBT people from New York (state)
American LGBT singers
People from Lowville, New York
Tina Burner
1980 births